The Kuwait Football Association is the governing body of football in Kuwait.

Kuwait has thrice been suspended by FIFA for political interference since 2007 and were allowed to participate in the 2011 Asian Cup qualifying campaign and other international competitions on a provisional basis.

Association staff

FIFA Suspension
Contrary to the road map established by FIFA and the AFC, the Kuwaiti Public Authority for Youth and Sport continued to interfere. Elections were held on 9 October in direct violation of the FIFA Executive Committee's May 2007 decision to the contrary. As a consequence, the committee recommended to the FIFA Executive Committee that the Kuwait Football Association be unsuspended. Kuwait's football federation board resigned days after world governing body FIFA unsuspended the Gulf Arab state. The suspension was lifted after the federation said it will ratify new statutes to prevent government interference in the sport as demanded by FIFA. "Otherwise FIFA will immediately suspend the (federation) again," FIFA said in a statement. The suspension was conditionally lifted and extended by the FIFA Congress in June 2009. FIFA was closely monitoring the situation within Kuwait.

On 16 October 2015, FIFA suspended Kuwait and all remaining results from AFC Asian Cup and FIFA World Cup qualification were added as forfeits while all Kuwaiti teams that were participating in international competitions were withdrawn. Kuwait tried to get the suspension lifted at the 66th FIFA Congress but this was rejected and therefore from the earlier announcement on 27 April 2016, the hosting of the Arabian Gulf Cup tournament was moved to Qatar. The suspension was eventually lifted on 6 December 2017 after Kuwait's adoption of a new sports law.

Competitions
STC Premier League
Kuwaiti Division One
Kuwaiti Futsal League
Kuwait Joint League (defunct)
Kuwait Emir Cup
Kuwait Crown Prince Cup
Al Khurafi Cup (defunct) 
Kuwait Federation Cup
Kuwait Super Cup
Kuwaiti Futsal Federation Cup
Kuwaiti Futsal Super Cup

Friendly Competitions
Kuwait Champions Challenge

Current champions

Defunct/paused

References

External links
 Official website 
 Kuwait at the FIFA website.
 Kuwait at AFC site

Football in Kuwait
Kuwait
Football
Sports organizations established in 1952
1952 establishments in Kuwait